Trade Centre 2, also known as Dubai Financial Centre, is a locality in Dubai, United Arab Emirates.

Geography 
Trade Centre 2 is located in the western Dubai, along Sheikh Zayed Road. It borders Trade Centre 1 to the north, Business Bay to the south, and Zabeel to the east.  Trade Centre 2 begins at Trade Centre Roundabout (Interchange No. 1), at the intersection of Sheikh Zayed Road and route D 63 (Al Dhiyafa Road) and terminates at Interchange No. 2 (Defence Roundabout). Like Trade Centre 1, Trade Centre 2 does not have a local road system. It is bounded to the east by 310th Road and to the south by route D 71 (Al Doha Street).

Trade Centre 2 consists of commercial and residential skyscrapers along Sheikh Zayed Road.  Important landmarks in Trade Centre 2 include Dubai World Trade Centre, Emirates Towers, Rose Tower, 21st Century Tower, Angsana Hotel & Suites, Al Yaqoub Tower, Dusit Dubai and Falcon Tower.

References 

Geography of Dubai